Gandhi Vega (born April 29, 1977, in Torreón, Mexico) is a former Mexican football defender who last played for Irapuato FC.

Honours

Club
Irapuato
Liga de Ascenso:
Winners (1):   Clausura 2011

References

External links

1977 births
Living people
Association football defenders
Mexican footballers
Liga MX players
Ascenso MX players
Tecos F.C. footballers
Club Necaxa footballers
Club León footballers
Club Atlético Zacatepec players
Correcaminos UAT footballers
Alacranes de Durango footballers
Irapuato F.C. footballers
Venados F.C. players
Footballers from Coahuila
Sportspeople from Torreón